Andrew Phillip Peeke (born March 17, 1998) is an American professional ice hockey defenseman who is currently playing for the  Columbus Blue Jackets of the National Hockey League (NHL). Peeke was selected 34th overall by the Blue Jackets in the 2016 NHL Entry Draft.

Early life
Peeke was born on March 17, 1998, in  Parkland, Florida, to parents Mary Ruth and Cliff. He began skating by the age of three and played ice hockey in the Junior Panthers program alongside baseball. Growing up, he was a fan of the Florida Panthers but favored Shea Weber. While playing with the Florida Panthers Alliance program, he helped their Major AAA team win the 2010 Early Bird Tournament Bantam A championship. However, due to the lack of ice hockey opportunities in Florida, Peeke moved to South Kent, Connecticut, when he was 14 to skate with the Selects Hockey Academy.

Playing career
Peeke played three seasons with the South Kent Prep School (USPHL) before being drafted by the Green Bay Gamblers of the United States Hockey League (USHL) and finishing his schooling at Ashwaubenon High School. During his time in the USPHL, he was named their Defensive Player of the Year and committed to play NCAA Division I ice hockey with the Notre Dame Fighting Irish men's ice hockey team. Upon joining the Gamblers for their 2015–16 season, he became their youngest defenseman on the roster at the age of 17. Peeke played one season with the Gamblers, during which he recorded four goals and 26 assists for 30 points through 56 games. He also finished the season being named to the 2016 recipient of the USHL Scholar-Athlete Award and USHL All-Academic Team.

Collegiate
Peeke played for the Notre Dame Fighting Irish men's ice hockey team for three seasons while majoring in management consulting. Prior to joining the team, he was drafted 34th overall by the Columbus Blue Jackets in the 2016 NHL Entry Draft, becoming the 13th American selected in the draft. Upon joining the Fighting Irish for the 2016–17 season, Peeke recorded 14 points in 40 games as the program transitioned from the Hockey East to Big Ten Conference. Before and during his rookie season, Peeke was encouraged by Blue Jackets management to work on his skating, shot, and release. Following his rookie season, he earned praise from the Jackets development coach Chris Clark for exceeding their expectations.

He returned to the Fighting Irish the following season for his sophomore campaign, where he set a new career-high in goals scored with five. Peeke served as captain for the Notre Dame Fighting Irish men's ice hockey team during the 2018–19 season.

Professional
Following his junior season with Notre Dame, Peeke was signed to a three-year, entry-level contract with the Columbus Blue Jackets on April 1, 2019. He scored his first career goal on February 16, 2020 against the New Jersey Devils. On August 9, 2021, Peeke signed a two-year, $1.575 million contract extension to remain with the Blue Jackets.

Career statistics

Regular season and playoffs

International

Awards and honours

References

External links

1998 births
Living people
Cleveland Monsters players
Columbus Blue Jackets draft picks
Columbus Blue Jackets players
Green Bay Gamblers players
Notre Dame Fighting Irish men's ice hockey players
American men's ice hockey defensemen
People from Parkland, Florida
Ice hockey people from Florida
Sportspeople from Broward County, Florida